Knauf Gips KG is a multinational, family-owned company based in Iphofen, Germany, well known for drywall gypsum boards, founded in 1932. The company is a producer of building materials and construction systems comprising construction materials for drywall construction, plasterboard, cement boards, mineral fibre acoustic boards, dry mortars with gypsum for internal plaster and cement-based external plaster and insulating materials; glass wool, stone wool and other insulation materials under the company Knauf Insulation.

It has more than 150 production sites worldwide. It is one of the six producers which hold approximately 81% of
the worldwide wallboard market (Georgia Pacific, Knauf,
Siniat, National Gypsum Company, Saint-Gobain, and Yoshino Gypsum Co., Ltd).

In 2022, after the invasion of Ukraine by Russia, Yale University published a list of companies that chose to remain active in Russia. According to this report, over 600 companies have withdrawn from Russia — but some remain. Knauf is still operating across 14 sites in Russia but suspend new investments.

See also
Chinese drywall
Knauf Insulation
Knauf USG Systems

References

External links
 

Companies based in Bavaria
Building materials companies
Multinational companies headquartered in Germany
Manufacturing companies of Germany
Manufacturing companies established in 1932
German brands
German companies established in 1932